Monarch High School can refer to several different schools:

Monarch School (San Diego) in California
Monarch High School (Colorado)
Monarch High School (Florida)
The Monarch School (in Texas)